Tatarbunary Raion was a raion (district) in Odessa Oblast of Ukraine. The raion was located in the south-west part of the oblast, along the Black Sea coast, and it was part of the historical region of Bessarabia. Its administrative center was the city of Tatarbunary. The raion was abolished and its territory was merged into Bilhorod-Dnistrovskyi Raion on 18 July 2020 as part of the administrative reform of Ukraine, which reduced the number of raions of Odessa Oblast to seven.  The last estimate of the raion population was 

Geographically, there were 1 city (Tatarbunary), and 35 villages in the raion. Administratively, there were 1 City Council (Tatarbunary), and 18 Village Councils.

History
Tatarbunary Raion was established in 1940, as one of 13 raions of newly established Akkerman Oblast (later Izmail Oblast) of Ukrainian SSR. The area was transferred from Kingdom of Romania to the USSR following June 1940 Soviet Ultimatum.

In 1954, Izmail Oblast was liquidated, and Tatarbunarskyi Raion, as well as other raions of the oblast, was transferred to Odessa Oblast.

In 1978, the administrative center of the raion, Tatarbunary, was given city status.

Administrative division
The raion was divided into 18 rural councils and one city council.

References

External links
Tatarbunarskyi Raion - Odessa Oblast Administration website
Tatarbunary raion - Verkhovna Rada website

Former raions of Odesa Oblast
1940 establishments in Ukraine
Ukrainian raions abolished during the 2020 administrative reform